Southern Pacific Railroad (SP) locomotive number 5623 is a passenger service-equipped "torpedo boat" version of an EMD GP9 diesel locomotive, built in 1955. SP 5623 featured a steam generator, dual control stands, and was delivered in the "black widow" paint scheme.

SP 5623's first assignments were passenger trains in Oregon, and then spent the rest of its passenger service career in the San Francisco Bay Area, pulling such trains as the Senator, Sacramento Daylight, Del Monte, and the San Francisco Peninsula commuter trains. SP 5623 was renumbered 3005 and painted into the grey and scarlet "bloody nose" paint scheme in 1966. After Amtrak assumed intercity passenger train service in 1971, SP 5623 (then numbered 3005) and all other SP passenger locomotives were assigned only to the SF Peninsula commuter trains. It was renumbered 3189 in 1977 after being rebuilt as a part of the SP's GRIP program. In 1985, it was displaced by the arrival of Caltrain equipment. It was then placed into local freight service for the rest of its regular service years.

SP 5623 was retired in 1991, and was purchased from a scrap dealer in 1992 by Errol Ohman and Howard Wise. The pair restored the locomotive and repainted it into its original "black widow" paint scheme and its original number (5623) in 1993. SP 5623 spent most of the 1990s working for the Oakland Terminal Railway. It traveled to the California State Railroad Museum in Sacramento, California for the "Mini-Railfair" in 1995 and appeared in a Shell Gasoline commercial in 1997. It then traveled with steam locomotive Southern Pacific 2467 to "Railfair '99" in Sacramento, and in January 2005, it moved to the Niles Canyon Railway in Sunol, California, where it is used in occasional excursion service.

References 
 
 

5623
Electro-Motive Division locomotives
B-B locomotives
Railway locomotives introduced in 1955
Diesel-electric locomotives of the United States
Preserved diesel locomotives
Standard gauge locomotives of the United States